Limnodriloides anxius is a species of clitellate oligochaete worm, first found in Belize, on the Caribbean side of Central America.

References

Further reading

 Aquatic Oligochaete Biology V. Springer Netherlands

External links
WORMS

Tubificina
Taxa named by Christer Erséus